French knickers (also called tap pants in the United States) are a type of women's underwear or lingerie. The term is predominantly used in the United Kingdom (UK) and Australia to describe a style of underpants that look similar to a pair of shorts. French knickers are worn from the hip, concealing some of the upper thigh and all of the buttocks. The garment features an "open leg" style (a loose fitting leg opening without elastic cuffs) that allows for a more comfortable fit and the straight-cut leg cuffs can be designed with or without trimming. The fabric is often bias cut.

French knickers are not to be confused with other underpants styles such as hipsters, briefs, bikini bottoms and boyshorts, all of which feature elasticated leg openings and fit snug to the body.

French knickers are ideally accompanied by full, flared and A-Line skirts, trousers and dresses, as they can add bulk and produce a visible panty line (VPL). The item is an elegant and  comfortable alternative to more fitted forms of underwear and luxury fabrics like silk are often used in their production.

History 
The French knicker style evolved from drawers, the baggy long-legged underwear of the Victorian era, and may have derived its name from the frilly underwear worn by Parisienne Can-Can dancers, existent from the late-1800s to the early-1900s; the French however, do not use the term. During the 1920s and 1930s, French knickers were very popular, but by the 1940s and 1950s, briefs were worn by most women; perhaps due to fabric shortages and the scarcity of silk. By the 1950s, the fitted underpant was almost universally worn.

During the nostalgia revival of the 1970s, French knickers returned to fashion through the designs of Janet Reger and others, and were especially popular in the 1980s for a speciality market. The popularity of French knickers declined again during the 1990s as younger consumers displayed a greater interest in other underwear styles, such as briefs and thongs. They are still available today, and most often found in vintage reproduction and speciality retailers.

References

Lingerie
Women's clothing